Leonard Meyer Sachs (26 September 1909 – 15 June 1990) was a South African-born British actor.

Life and career
Sachs was born in the town of Roodepoort, in the then Transvaal Colony, present day South Africa. He was Jewish. He emigrated to the United Kingdom in 1929 and had many television and film roles from the 1930s to the 1980s, including Mowbray in the 1950 BBC Television version of Richard II, John Wesley in the 1954 film of the same name and Lord Mount Severn in East Lynne from 1976.

He founded an Old Time Music Hall, named the Players' Theatre, in Villiers Street, Charing Cross, London. He appeared as the Chairman of the Leeds City Varieties in the long-running BBC television series The Good Old Days, which ran from 1953 to 1983, and became known for his elaborate, sesquipedalian introductions of the performers. Sachs was honoured in a 1977 episode of This Is Your Life.

Sachs appeared in Danger Man with Patrick McGoohan. He had two appearances in the science fiction series Doctor Who: as Admiral Gaspard de Coligny in The Massacre of St Bartholomew's Eve in 1966 and as Lord President Borusa in Arc of Infinity in 1983. He also appeared in the 1985 Royal Variety Performance in a tribute to The Good Old Days.

Personal life
Sachs married the actress Eleanor Summerfield in 1947. The couple had two sons, the actor Robin Sachs and Toby Sachs.

In January 1984, he was fined £75 for "importuning men for an immoral purpose" at Notting Hill Gate tube station.

Sachs died from kidney failure in on 15 June 1990 in Westminster, London, at the age of 80.

Selected filmography

 The Secret of Stamboul (1936) – Arif
 State Secret (1950) – Dr. Poldoi
 The Story of Gilbert and Sullivan (1953) – Smythe
 John Wesley (1954) – John Wesley
 Malaga (1954) – Paul Dupont
 The Men of Sherwood Forest (1954) – Sheriff of Nottingham
 Gentlemen Marry Brunettes (1955) – M. Dufy
 Count of Twelve (1955) – Mark Dyson (episode "Blind Man's Bluff")
 The Gamma People (1956) – Telegraph Clerk
 Odongo (1956) – Game Warden
 Face in the Night (1957) – Victor
 After the Ball (1957)  – Richard Warner
 Seven Thunders (1957) – German Officer (uncredited)
 Man from Tangier (1957) – Heinrich
 The Man Who Wouldn't Talk (1958) – Professor Horvard
 Behemoth the Sea Monster (1959) – Scientist
 The Dover Road Mystery (1960) – Herbert Roberts
 Beyond the Curtain (1960) – Waiter
 Oscar Wilde (1960) – Richard Legallienne
 The Siege of Sidney Street (1960) – Svaars (uncredited)
 The Bulldog Breed (1960) – Yachtsman (uncredited)
 Five Golden Hours (1961) – Mr. Morini
 Konga (1961) – Bob's Father
 Taste of Fear (1961) – Mr. Spratt
 Pit of Darkness (1961) – Clifton Conrad
 Bomb in the High Street (1961) – Freeling
 Locker Sixty-Nine (1962) – Spencer
 She Knows Y'Know (1962) – John Dawson
 Freud: The Secret Passion (1962) – Brouhardier
 Stranglehold (1963) – The Dutchman
 Panic (1963) – Len Collier
 The Amorous Adventures of Moll Flanders (1965) – Prison Doctor
 Thunderball (1965) – Group Captain Pritchard
 Once Is Not Enough (1975) – Dr. Peterson

References

External links

1909 births
1990 deaths
British male television actors
British male film actors
South African male television actors
South African male film actors
South African Jews
South African emigrants to the United Kingdom
Bisexual male actors
South African LGBT actors
English LGBT actors
Bisexual Jews
People from Roodepoort
People prosecuted under anti-homosexuality laws
Jewish British male actors
20th-century British male actors
20th-century LGBT people